Magnus Mandersson (born May 12, 1959) is a Swedish businessman. He was Executive Vice President at telecommunications company Ericsson from 2011 to 2017, and is currently chairman of Tampnet AS, Karnov Group and NEXT Biometrics.

Biography 

Magnus currently serves as the chairman of Tampnet AS, operating the world's largest offshore communication network, Karnov Group, providing legal and tax related information services, and NEXT Biometrics, developing biometric authentication tools. He is also a member of the Advisory Council of Interogo Foundation.

At Ericsson, his last role was as head of Business Unit Global Services. Prior to assuming this role in 2010, he had been responsible for Business Unit CDMA Mobile Systems, Ericsson's businesses in Northern Europe, the Global Customer Account Deutsche Telekom AG and  Managed Services business globally.

Preceding his work at Ericsson, he has held management positions within the Swedish conglomerate Kinnevik, as both COO of Millicom SA and CEO of Tele2 Europe. Mandersson also held the position as the first President of Comviq Vietnam/Mobifone in 1994. In the beginning of his career, he worked at IKEA in Europe and Asia.

Mandersson holds a Bachelor's degree in Business Administration from Lund University. He has been residing, with his family, in Luxembourg since 1997.

References

External links
Reuters -  Ericsson appoints head of key Global Services area

Lund University alumni
1959 births
Ericsson people
Living people
People from Halmstad
Chief operating officers
Swedish chairpersons of corporations